Empis (Xanthempis) testacea is a species of 'dance' flies belonging to the family Empididae subfamily Empidinae.

This species is mainly present in France, Germany, Italy, Spain and the Netherlands.

This large size fly shows a light grey mesonotum with three dark stripes, wings are clear, yellow at the base with distinct veins, the legs are mainly reddish, while the abdomen is yellowish-brown.

References
 Di Milan Chvála -The Empidoidea (Diptera) of Fennoscandia and Denmark: Genus Empis -  Books

External links
 Biolib
 Fauna Europaea

Empis
Diptera of Europe